William Mellor could refer to: 

Bill Mellor (1874–1940), American baseball player
Bill Mellor (footballer), (1886–1938), English football goalkeeper
Chip Mellor (full name William H. Mellor), American lawyer and political activist
Will Mellor (born 1976), (British actor)
William Mellor (journalist) (1888–1942), British journalist and left-wing political activist
William Mellor (footballer),  English footballer
William C. Mellor (1903–1963), American cinematographer
William Frederick Mellor, English missionary

See also
Billy Mellors, Scottish indoor and lawn bowler
Jack Mellor (footballer, born 1896), English footballer
John William Mellor (1835–1911), English lawyer
Joseph William Mellor, English chemist